Katharine Augusta Carl (February 12, 1865 – December 7, 1938) (sometimes spelled Katherine Carl) was an American portrait painter and author. She made paintings of notable and royal people in the United States, Europe and Asia. She spent nine months in China in 1903 painting a portrait of the Empress Dowager Cixi for the St. Louis Exposition. On her return to America, she published a book about her experience, titled With the Empress Dowager of China.

Early life
Katharine Augusta Carl was born in New Orleans, Louisiana on February 12, 1865, the daughter of Francis Augustus Carl, Ph.D., LL.D. and Mary Breadon Carl. She had a brother named Francis A. Carl.

Education
Carl graduated with a Master of Arts from the Tennessee State Female College in 1882. She studied art under Gustave-Claude-Etienne Courtois and William-Adolphe Bouguereau in Paris, and then exhibited her works in the Paris salons.

Career

Overview
Carl painted portraits, including those made in 1892 of Mahomet Ali and Prince El Hadj in Algiers. She made portraits of Paul S. Reinsch and Sir Richard Dame.

Throughout her career, she traveled and painted in Europe and China many times. Carl exhibited her work at the Palace of Fine Arts and The Woman's Building at the 1893 World's Columbian Exposition in Chicago, Illinois. In London, she was a member of the Lyceum Club and the International Society of Women Painters. She was a member of the Société des Artistes Français of Paris, the International Jury of Fine Arts, and the International Jury of Applied Arts of the St. Louis Exposition.

China and Empress Dowager Cixi
Katharine Carl was contacted by Sarah Pike Conger, the wife of American Ambassador Edwin H. Conger with an offer to come to China in the summer of 1903 to paint a portrait of the Empress Dowager Cixi for the Chinese exhibit at the 1904 Louisiana Purchase Exposition. She spent a total of nine months in China and painted four portraits of the Empress Dowager, later recording her memories as the only western foreigner to live within the precincts of the Chinese imperial court in its last days in a book that was published in 1906.

She stayed there under the provision that she did not share information about Forbidden City. The Empress Dowager honored Carl with the Order of the Double Dragon and the Flaming Pearl.

Katharine Carl wrote of her time in China provide a unique and intimate assessment of the Empress Dowager Cixi, in the book With the Empress Dowager of China. To her dismay, the press incorrectly reported that she made unflattering remarks about the Empress.

Carl's brother, Francis, worked for Sir Robert Hart at the Imperial Chinese Maritime Customs Service. She apparently stayed at Hart's house at some point and was described by him as "very breezy - quite a tornado". While in China, she painted portraits of H.E. Tseng, former Lord Chamberlain to the Chinese Emperor, and former president of the Republic of China, Li Yuanhung.

Personal life
She lived in New York City at 51 Washington Square and had a studio in the city.

In her later years she lived on East Seventy Eight Street in New York City.  Carl died December 7, 1938 of burns at Lenox Hill Hospital she received when taking a bath at her apartment.

In popular culture
Katharine Carl was portrayed by Sylvia in the 2006 Chinese television series Princess Der Ling.

Gallery

Notes

References

Further reading
 Muriel Molland Jernigan, Forbidden City, New York, Crown Publishers, 1954.
 Lolan Wang Grady, Book Review of With the Empress Dowager Of China by Katharine Augusta Carl, Association of Universities and Colleges of Canada, Ottawa.

External links

 

1865 births
1938 deaths
American women painters
19th-century American painters
20th-century American painters
American portrait painters
20th-century American non-fiction writers
20th-century American women writers
Artists from New Orleans
Writers from New Orleans
Painters from Louisiana
Accidental deaths in New York (state)
20th-century American women artists
19th-century American women artists
American women non-fiction writers